Henrik Bryld Wolsing better known as Hennedub, is a Danish Los Angeles-based music producer. Hennedub is best known for his work with Gilli, Kesi, and Lukas Graham, and also releases music in his own name.

Career
Hennedub won the 2017 Danish Music Awards prize for Best Producer. That year he produced “Kesi 'Mamacita’”, which was named one of the top ten Hip Hop songs produced by Danish musicians of the 2010s by SoundVenue, an article that also noted his track from the same decade “Consigliere”. In 2017 he moved from Denmark to the United States, and became based in Los Angeles. He has partnered with musicians on his original music including Kesi. and Jessie Reyez. His work with Jessie Reyez on the album Being Human in Public, saw him nominated for a Grammy Award.

Discography

Albums

EPs

Awards and nominations

References 

1994 births
Living people
Danish record producers